Alexei Eremenko (born Aleksei Alekseyevich Yeryomenko; ; born 24 March 1983) is a former professional footballer. He is from a footballing family, with his father, Alexei Eremenko Sr., and brother Roman Eremenko also playing professionally.

Eremenko was born in Rostov-on-Don in the Soviet Union, but grew up in Finland. He made his breakthrough with HJK in 2002, and became known as versatile midfielder and a set piece specialist. A mediocre spell with Italian club Lecce followed, before he came to prominence at Russian club Saturn. He moved to Metalist Kharkiv in 2009, but was loaned out twice, especially impressing with Kilmarnock where he was nominated for the 2010–11 Players' Player of the Year award. He returned to the club on a permanent deal in January 2014. After failing to negotiate a contract extension, he played in Finland until retiring from football in 2017.

Eremenko represented Finland between 2003 and 2013, and was a key player for the team in 2006 World Cup qualifying, scoring seven goals, four of which came from free kicks. He ended his international career with 57 caps in which he scored 14 goals.

Early life
Eremenko was born in Rostov-on-Don, Russian SFSR, Soviet Union but moved to Finland with his family at the age of seven when his father, former FC Dynamo Moscow and FC Spartak Moscow player Alexei Eremenko Sr., came to play in Finland with FF Jaro. He was granted Finnish citizenship in 2003, but still holds a Russian passport as well. He is the elder brother of fellow footballers Roman Eremenko and Sergei Eremenko.

Club career
Eremenko spent some time with Tromsø IL in Norway (his father played for the senior team, he himself played for the under-fifteen team) and with the youth academy of FC Metz in France, before returning to Finland to make his Veikkausliiga debut with FC Jokerit in 2001. A trial with Aston Villa followed, but in the next season he moved to HJK, and eventually became the league's top player. He won two Finnish championships and one Finnish Cup with HJK. In the summer of 2004, Eremenko moved abroad, joining Italian Serie A club U.S. Lecce. After failing to make a major breakthrough at Lecce, he moved to FC Saturn on a four-year deal in January 2006 transfer window, becoming a key player for the Russian side.

Metalist Kharkiv
On 29 July 2009, Eremenko signed a three-year contract with the Ukrainian club FC Metalist Kharkiv, and  scored his first goal in his debut game against HNK Rijeka.

Jaro (loan)
On 12 March 2010, it was announced that Eremenko had been traded back to his first club, FF Jaro, for the 2010 season (his father was the club's manager at the time). He managed to score on his debut, in a Finnish League Cup game against JJK on 20 March 2010. He also continued scoring in Veikkausliiga's opening match against FC Lahti, scoring on a rebound after his unsuccessful penalty kick.

Kilmarnock (loan)
On 30 August 2010, it was announced that Eremenko had been traded to Mixu Paatelainen's Kilmarnock until the end of the season. He scored on his debut in a 2–1 victory over St Mirren. On 5 March 2011, Eremenko was given his second straight red card of the season against Hearts at Tynecastle after an off the ball altercation with the opposition captain Marius Zaliukas. On 11 April, Eremenko stated that he wanted to end his career at Rugby Park. Eremenko was nominated for the 2010–11 Players' Player of the Year award, losing out to Celtic's Emilio Izaguirre.

After returning from his loan spell, Metalist Kharkiv told him he could leave, where he then stated that he had received bids from an English Championship club and a Russian club, with reports that Scottish Old Firm duo Celtic and Rangers were interested in signing him. The Championship club was later reported to be the Welsh club Cardiff City. Brighton & Hove Albion, a fellow Championship club, were also believed to be interested in signing him. On 15 July 2011, it was reported in a Finnish newspaper that Eremenko was signing for Leeds United, but the transfer was delayed due to a cancelled flight, which prevented him from linking up with the squad in Scotland.

Rubin Kazan
On 30 August 2011, Eremenko signed a contract with Russian club Rubin Kazan alongside his younger brother Roman.

Kairat
In June 2013 Kairat signed Eremenko on a free transfer from Rubin Kazan. He terminated his contract with Kairat on 26 November 2013.

Kilmarnock return
On 28 January 2014, it was announced that Eremenko had re-joined Kilmarnock until the end of the 2013–14 season. On 7 August 2014, he signed a new contract at Kilmarnock, keeping him at the club for the 2014–15 season. At the end of that season, Eremenko left the club after failing to agree to the terms on a new contract.

Jaro (second spell)
On 7 August 2015, Eremenko signed again for FF Jaro, agreeing to a contract until the end of the 2015 Veikkausliiga season, with the contract also containing a clause allowing him to move abroad should he receive a suitable offer.

SJK
On 26 January 2016, Eremenko moved to SJK. After just over three months, Eremenko left SJK on 4 May 2016 due to personal reasons.

International career
Eremenko made his debut for the Finnish national team on 11 October 2003 against Canada. He was a key player for Finland in 2006 World Cup qualifying, scoring seven goals, four of which came from free kicks. He shared the third position among the top scorers in the group, along with Adrian Mutu, but behind Jan Koller and  Ruud van Nistelrooy who both scored nine goals.

Career statistics

International

International goals
As of 15 November 2011.

Honours

Club
HJK Helsinki
Veikkausliiga: 2002, 2003
Finnish Cup: 2003

Rubin Kazan
Russian Cup: 2011–12
Russian Super Cup: 2012

Individual
Scottish Premier League Player of the Month: November 2010
Scottish Premier League Player of the Year: 2010/11 nominee

References

External links
 
 
 
 
 
 
 
 Finn, Iltalehti, 14 September 2006. 

1983 births
Living people
Finnish footballers
Finnish expatriate footballers
Finland international footballers
FF Jaro players
U.S. Lecce players
Serie A players
Association football midfielders
Association football forwards
FC Jokerit players
Helsingin Jalkapalloklubi players
Russian-speaking Finns
Finnish people of Russian descent
Finnish people of Ukrainian descent
Soviet emigrants to Finland
FC Saturn Ramenskoye players
FC Rubin Kazan players
FC Metalist Kharkiv players
FC Kairat players
Kilmarnock F.C. players
Expatriate footballers in Norway
Finnish expatriate sportspeople in Norway
Expatriate footballers in France
Finnish expatriate sportspeople in France
Expatriate footballers in Italy
Finnish expatriate sportspeople in Italy
Expatriate footballers in Russia
Finnish expatriate sportspeople in Russia
Expatriate footballers in Ukraine
Finnish expatriate sportspeople in Ukraine
Veikkausliiga players
Russian Premier League players
Ukrainian Premier League players
Scottish Premier League players
Scottish Professional Football League players
Kazakhstan Premier League players
Expatriate footballers in Scotland
Naturalized citizens of Finland
Expatriate footballers in Kazakhstan